The Blacksands Pacific Group is an international oil and gas exploration and production and trading company headquartered in Los Angeles and Houston, with assets in North America, Asia and Africa.  The company also transports, stores, purchases and markets crude oil and natural gas.  The Chairman and CEO of Blacksands Pacific is Raheem J. Brennerman.

History 

Blacksands Pacific was founded in 2010 by Raheem J. Brennerman, an experienced investor with interests in energy and real estate.  Originally an energy trading company marketing crude oil and petroleum products, the company expanded to focus on exploration and production. Blacksands Pacific now also transports, stores, purchases and markets crude oil, natural gas, natural gas liquids and bitumen.

In September 2011, Blacksands Pacific entered into a commercial partnership with Sigmund Oilfields Limited, a Nigerian indigenous oil & gas exploration and production company, to explore, develop and produce oil from offshore the Niger Delta, but later withdrew.

In October 2011, the company formed a joint venture with Oil and Gas Technology Fund Inc to develop the Torrance Field acreage located in the Los Angeles Basin, California and explore and develop other prospects in Nevada.

In February 2012, Blacksands Pacific invested in a joint venture to develop the oil prospects within the Williston Basin Prospect, in North Dakota.

Current Operations 

Operating in nine countries, Blacksands Pacific has announced that it is investing significantly in E&P and midstream oil and gas projects in Nigeria and Côte d'Ivoire, and has entered into joint ventures in mining and infrastructure projects, including a project to regasify and distribute liquified natural gas (LNG) in Africa.
During an interview with LEADERS magazine in October 2014, Mr. Brennerman revealed that Blacksands Pacific had experienced significant growth, especially in exploration and production, but that it was divesting its smaller interest assets in order to focus on larger assets that the company was acquiring, such as assets in the Gulf of Mexico that are expanding to produce over 100,000 barrels by 2019.

References

External links

Oil companies of the United States